Peristarium aurora is a species of large sea snail, marine gastropod mollusk in the family Turbinellidae.

Description

Distribution

References

Turbinellidae
Gastropods described in 1971